Aelquntam is a Native American mythological figure of the Nuxalk Nation people. He is the head of all supernatural beings and gods, similar to Juno or Jupiter.

References

Nuxalk gods